New Orleans Square is a themed land found at Disneyland Park in Anaheim, California. Based on 19th-century New Orleans, Louisiana, the roughly three-acre area was the first land to be added to Disneyland after the park's opening, at a cost of $18 million. It is exclusive to Disneyland, although a similarly themed area can be found within Adventureland at Tokyo Disneyland.

The word "square" is a bit of a misnomer, since the area does not resemble a traditional urban plaza as much as an intricate series of "streets" that weave around shops, restaurants and the Pirates of the Caribbean show building. At one point, it included the only overnight accommodations in the park open to the public, the now closed Disneyland Dream Suite.

History
Plans to include a New Orleans-themed area were made in the late 1950s as a part of an expansion and the area was even included on a 1958 souvenir map. In 1961–1962, construction began on the land and the attractions.

The land was opened to the public on July 24, 1966, with New Orleans Mayor Victor H. Schiro participating in the dedication ceremony. Schiro announced Walt Disney had been made an honorary citizen of New Orleans; Disney joked that the addition cost as much as the original Louisiana Purchase. Without adjusting for inflation, it actually cost more. The opening ceremony was Disney's last major public appearance at Disneyland before his death in December 1966.

In March 1967, Pirates of the Caribbean debuted alongside the Blue Bayou Restaurant. In August 1969, The Haunted Mansion was opened to the public.

Attractions and entertainment

Current attractions and entertainment
 Disneyland Railroad (1966-present)
 The Haunted Mansion (1969-present)
 Pirates of the Caribbean (1967-present)

Former attractions and entertainment
 Pirates Arcade Museum (1967–1980)
 The Disney Gallery (1987–2007)
 Princess Tiana's Mardi Gras Celebration (2009–2010)

Restaurants
 Mint Julep Bar (non-alcoholic)
 Café Orleans
 Royal Street Veranda
 Blue Bayou Restaurant
 Club 33
 21 Royal

Future restaurants
 Tiana's Palace

Former restaurants

 Le Petite Patisserie (1988–2004)
 French Market Restaurant (1966–2023)

Shops

 La Mascarade D'Orleans
 Port Royal Curios and Curiosities: Haunted Mansion merchandise
 Mlle. Antoinette's Parfumerie: Perfumes
 Royal Street Sweets: Candies
 Pieces of Eight: Merchandise from the Pirates Of The Caribbean ride
 Cristal d'Orleans: Jewelry 
 Eudora's Chic Boutique Featuring Tiana's Gourmet Secrets: Princess and the Frog merchandise

Former shops
 Bookstand (1966–1973)
 Le Chapeau (1966–1974)
 Le Forgeron (1966–1974)
 Lafitte's Silver Shop (1966–1988)
 Candy Cart (1966–1995)
 One-of-a-Kind Shop (1966–1996)
 Le Gourmet (1966–1998)
 La Boutique d'Or (1974–1980)
 Marche aux Fleurs (1975–1985)
 Chocolate Collection (1980–1995)
 Port d'Orleans (1995–2002)
 La Boutique de Noel (1998–2006)
 L'Ornement Magique (1998–2013)
 Le Bat en Rouge (1966-2020)

In popular culture
 In the Epic Mickey video game series, Wasteland's version of New Orleans Square is Bog Easy (whose name is based on New Orleans' nickname "Big Easy").

References

Culture of New Orleans
Themed areas in Walt Disney Parks and Resorts
Disneyland
 
Amusement parks opened in 1966
Amusement rides introduced in 1966
1966 establishments in California